Haiterbach is a town in the district of Calw, in Baden-Württemberg, Germany.

History
Haiterbach was given its town rights by the Counts of Hohenberg in 1349. The County of Hohenberg sold Haiterbach and the villages of Beihingen and Oberschwandorf to the County of Württemberg in 1363. In 1938, the Oberamt was dissolved and Haiterbach, Beihingen, Oberschwandorf, and Unterschwandorf were assigned to Landkreis Calw. Beihingen and Unterschwandorf were merged into Haiterbach in 1972. Oberschwandorf was incorporated in 1975.

Geography
The township of (Stadt) of Haiterbach is located at the southern tipof the district of Calw, along its border with the district of Freudenstadt to the south. The landscape of Haiterbach's municipal area is defined by the Waldach and its tributaries. Elevation above sea level in the municipal area ranges from a high of  Normalnull (NN) to a low of  NN.

Politics
Haiterbach has four boroughs (Ortsteile), Beihingen, Haiterbach, Oberschwandorf, and Unterschwandorf, and three villages, Altnuifra, Gründelhof, and Schloss Unterschwandorf. The abandoned village of Utenweiler is also located in the municipal area.

Coat of arms
Haiterbach's municipal coat of arms is divided party per fess into an upper field of white and a lower field of red. The lower part of the shield was the earlier pattern used by the government of Haiterbach, being used in the earliest town seals from around 1403. There is no known definite origin for the eagle's foot.

Transportation

References

Calw (district)